The Shakespeare's Globe Centres are international centres for theatrical education and for the promotion of the Shakespeare's Globe in London, their nucleus organisation.

Shakespeare Globe Centre Canada
The Shakespeare Globe Centre of Canada was founded in Toronto in 1985 by Christina and Lyle Blair as a not-for-profit organisation, with a board including John Orrell and Christopher Plummer.

Shakespeare Globe Centre Germany
The SGC (Shakespeare Globe Zentrum Deutschland) was founded in 1991 after Sam Wanamaker experienced the Bremer Shakespeare Company's productions of The Taming of the Shrew and Antony and Cleopatra at the Globe Theatre in Neuss and directed by the company's co-founder Norbert Kentrup.  It was officially registered in December 2000, and its boardmembers include Kentrup, Dagmar Papula, Heinz Abeling (SET) and Dr. Vanessa Schormann.

Shakespeare Globe Centre New Zealand
Sam Wanamaker visited New Zealand in 1990, and the Shakespeare Globe Centre New Zealand was founded in Wellington the following year by Dawn Sanders.  Through it, the Wellington Shakespeare Society contributed what are now called the New Zealand Hangings, tapestries for scenery at the Globe.

Shakespeare Globe Centre USA
The Shakespeare Globe Centre USA, in New York City, was the first to be founded, in 1974, as a launchpad for the reconstruction of the Globe Theatre in London.

References

External links
Shakespeare's Globe - Shakespeare's Globe Centres

Shakespearean scholarship
Theatre in Toronto
Theatre in Germany
Theatre in England
Theatre in the United States
Theatre in New Zealand
Drama schools in Canada
Drama schools in Germany
Drama schools in the United Kingdom
Drama schools in the United States
Drama schools in New Zealand
Theatre in New York City